Robin Wayne Zander (born January 23, 1953) is an American musician, best known as the lead singer and rhythm guitarist for the rock band Cheap Trick, but is also a solo artist. Zander was inducted into the Rock and Roll Hall of Fame in 2016 as a member of Cheap Trick.

Early life
Zander was born in Beloit, Wisconsin, and grew up in nearby Loves Park, Illinois. He learned to play the guitar by age 12. Zander graduated from Harlem High School in Machesney Park, Illinois. After playing in high school bands in the 1960s, he joined Brian Beebe to form the folk duo Zander & Kent in the early 1970s.

Music career

Cheap Trick

In 1974, Zander accepted an invitation to join Cheap Trick. Along with Zander, the band consisted of guitarist Rick Nielsen, bassist Tom Petersson, and drummer Bun E. Carlos. Cheap Trick's 1979 album, Cheap Trick at Budokan, catapulted the band to stardom. The band reached the Top 10 in the U.S. charts in 1979 with "I Want You to Want Me" and topped the charts in 1988 with "The Flame". As of 2018, Cheap Trick had been a band for over 40 years. Cheap Trick has performed more than 5,000 shows and has sold more than 20 million albums. Zander was inducted into the Rock and Roll Hall of Fame as a member of Cheap Trick in 2016.

Other work
Zander released the solo album Robin Zander in 1993. A second solo album, Countryside Blvd, was released online in April 2011 but was withdrawn from online music outlets within hours of being available.

On September 30, 2016, Los Angeles rock band Steel Panther released a cover version of Cheap Trick song "She's Tight" (from Cheap Trick's 1982 album One On One), which features Zander in the music video.

Influence
Known for his "pin-up good looks", Zander's singing has been described as "jaw-dropping" and "supremely virtuosic". In a 2014 piece titled "Unsung Heroes: The 10 Most Underrated Classic Rock Singers", Dan Tucker of VH1.com described Zander as having "range, style and attitude." Zander is a tenor.

Zander's vocal style has influenced many other rock singers, from 1980s hard rockers (such as Joe Elliott of Def Leppard, Vince Neil of Mötley Crüe, Axl Rose of Guns N' Roses, Bret Michaels of Poison, and Sebastian Bach of Skid Row) to 1990s punk revivalists (such as Billie Joe Armstrong of Green Day) to alternative icons (such as Billy Corgan of The Smashing Pumpkins, Eddie Vedder of Pearl Jam, Kurt Cobain of Nirvana, and Scott Weiland of Stone Temple Pilots).

The May 2009 issue of Classic Rock magazine published a list of the 50 Greatest Singers in Rock. Zander was voted #23 on the list by readers, Classic Rock critics and a number of singers.

Personal life

Zander and his first wife, Karen, had two children: A son named Ian Zander and a daughter named Holland Zander. Ian and Holland Zander are musicians.

As of 2018, Zander lives in Safety Harbor, Florida with his wife, former Playboy Playmate Pamela Stein. Zander and Stein have a son, Robin Taylor Zander, and a daughter, Robin-Sailor Zander; both are singer-songwriters.  When Cheap Trick bassist Tom Petersson was sidelined from touring in 2021 due to surgery, Robin Taylor Zander filled in for him on tour.

Solo discography

Albums
Robin Zander (1993)
Countryside Blvd (2011)

Singles
 "In This Country" (1987), from the soundtrack to Over the Top.
 "You Send the Rain Away" (1987) duet with Rebbie Jackson, #50 Billboard's Hot R&B/Hip-Hop Songs.
 "Surrender to Me" with Ann Wilson (1988), from the soundtrack to Tequila Sunrise, #6 Billboard's Hot 100 Chart, #42 Billboard's Mainstream Rock.
 "I've Always Got You" (1993), #13 Billboard's Mainstream Rock, from the album Robin Zander.

References

External links

1953 births
20th-century American male singers
20th-century American singers
21st-century American male singers
21st-century American singers
American people of German descent
American male guitarists
American rock guitarists
American rock singers
Cheap Trick members
Living people
Singers from Wisconsin
People from Loves Park, Illinois
People from Beloit, Wisconsin
People from Pinellas County, Florida
Rhythm guitarists
Singers from Florida
Power pop musicians
Guitarists from Florida
Guitarists from Wisconsin
20th-century American guitarists